The 1975 Tokyo WCT, also known by its sponsored name Kawasaki Tennis Classic, was a men's tennis tournament played on carpet courts in Tokyo, Japan. The event was part of the Red Group of the 1975 World Championship Tennis circuit. It was the third and final edition of the tournament and was held from 14 April through 20 April 1975. Seventh-seeded Bob Lutz won the singles title.

Finals

Singles
 Bob Lutz defeated  Stan Smith 6–4, 6–4
 It was Lutz' 1st singles title of the year and the 6th of his career.

Doubles
 Bob Lutz /  Stan Smith defeated  John Alexander /  Phil Dent 6–4, 6–7(6–8), 6–2

References

External links
 ITF tournament edition details

Tokyo WCT
Tokyo WCT
1975 in Japanese tennis
April 1975 sports events in Asia